Supplication (also known as petitioning) is a form of prayer, wherein one party humbly or earnestly asks another party to provide something, either for the party who is doing the supplicating (e.g., "Please spare my life.") or on behalf of someone else.

In Classical Greek religion
Supplication is a theme of earliest antiquity, embodied in the Iliad as the prayers of Chryses for the return of his daughter, and of Priam for the dead body of his son, Hector. Richard Martin notes repeated references to supplicants throughout the poem, including warriors begging to be spared by the Greeks on the battlefield.

In Christianity
In Christianity, the prayer of supplication for health by and on behalf of the sick is referenced in early Christian writings in the New Testament, especially James 5:13-16.

One example of supplication is the Western Christian ritual of novena (from novem, the Latin word for "nine") wherein one repeatedly asks for the same favor over a period of nine days. This ritual began in Spain during the Middle Ages when a nine-day period of hymns and prayers led up to a Christmas feast, a period which ended with gift giving. A contemporary Christian example of supplication is the practice of the Daily Prayer for Peace by the Community of Christ where a member prays for peace each day at a specified time. Philippians 4:6 says, "Be anxious for nothing, but in everything by prayer and supplication, with thanksgiving, let your requests be made known to God."

In Islam
In Islam, the Arabic word duʻā (plural daʿwat or ʾadʿiyah) is used to refer to supplications. Adʻiya may be made in any language, although there are many traditional Islamic supplications in Arabic, Persian and Turkish. In Islam, duʻā tends to mean supplication. The supplications (Duaas) of Prophets are given in the Quran.
There are a number of supplications mentioned in Islam in the Quran and Sunnah that can be recited for various purposes for the blessings and the rewards of Allah. Supplications can range in nature for everyday tasks like sleeping, eating, drinking water and can be more specific in nature like supplications for  knowledge or supplications for health and more. 

The Quran is the most authentic source of supplications and 30 such supplications that are mentioned in the Quran are most commonly recited by Muslims.

In Sikhism
The word Ardâs ( ਅਰਦਾਸ ) is derived from the Persian word 'Arazdashat', meaning a request, a supplication, a prayer, a petition or an address to a superior authority. It is a Sikh prayer that is done before performing or after undertaking any significant task; after reciting the daily Banis (prayers); or after completion of a service like the Paath, kirtan (hymn-singing) program or any other religious program. In Sikhism, these prayers are also said before and after eating. The prayer is a plea to God to support and help the devotee with whatever he or she is about to undertake or has done.

References

External links

 Supplication Prayers and Supplications from the Quran and the Sunnah
 In Praise of God Supplications by the great-grandson of the Prophet Muhammad (Ali ibn Husayn Zayn al-Abidin)
 Prayer types in Judaism, Christianity and Islam: Do You Pray Like Your Fathers?

Prayer
Religious terminology